Zoom is a 2015 live-action/animated comedy-drama film directed by Pedro Morelli and starring Gael García Bernal, Alison Pill, and Mariana Ximenes. It premiered at the 2015 Toronto International Film Festival.

Plot
The film is a multi-dimensional interface between comic book artist Emma Boyles (drawing Deacon's reality), novelist Michelle (writing Boyles' reality), and film director Edward Deacon (filming Michelle's reality). Each lives in a separate reality but authors a story about one of the others.

Emma, working at a sex doll factory in Toronto, fantasizes about having larger breasts and undergoes augmentation surgery, only to regret her choice.

Edward has a big Spanish penis that Emma makes small because of her frustration at not having the money to have her implants removed.

Things get worse as Michelle thinks of original ways of making money such as winning the lotto. She ends up  choosing a mail drug drop meant to be for the personal trainer next door.

Cast
 Gael García Bernal as Edward Deacon
 Alison Pill as Emma Boyles
 Mariana Ximenes as Michelle
 Tyler Labine as Bob
 Don McKellar as Horowitz
 Jennifer Irwin as Marissa
 Michael Eklund as moustache guy
 Cláudia Ohana as Alice
 Clé Bennett as Carl Stromway
 Rick Roberts as plastic surgeon
 Jason Priestley as Dale

Awards and nominations

References

External links
 
 
 
 
 Fantastic Fest 2015: Zoom
 Zoom at Library and Archives Canada

2015 films
2015 animated films
2015 comedy-drama films
2015 multilingual films
2010s English-language films
2010s Portuguese-language films
Brazilian animated films
Brazilian comedy-drama films
Brazilian multilingual films
Canadian animated feature films
Canadian comedy-drama films
Canadian multilingual films
English-language Brazilian films
English-language Canadian films
Films about comics
Films set in Rio de Janeiro (city)
Films shot in Lisbon
Films shot in São Paulo
Films shot in Toronto
Films with live action and animation
2010s Canadian films